Promises! Promises! (presented as Promises... Promises! on screen) is a 1963 American sex comedy film directed by King Donovan and starring Tommy Noonan (who also served as coproducer) and Jayne Mansfield. Released at the end of the Production Code era and before the MPAA film rating system became effective in 1968, it was the first Hollywood film of the sound era to feature nudity by a mainstream star (Mansfield).

Plot
Sandy Brooks is desperate to become pregnant, but her husband Jeff, a television script writer, is too stressed to make love to her. They take a pleasure cruise and meet Claire and King Banner. The couples set out on a drunken spree and change partners after returning to their rooms. Both women later discover that they are pregnant and must determine which man is the father of each baby.

Production
Tommy Noonan had offered the role of Claire to Mamie Van Doren, but she declined and was replaced with Marie McDonald, in her  final screen appearance. Ceil Chapman worked on McDonald's wardrobe for the film.

During production, producer/actor Tommy Noonan and Mansfield argued so much that Noonan recruited 20th Century Fox publicist Jet Fore to keep peace on the set.

Mansfield sings two songs in the film: "I'm in Love" (also known as the "Lullaby of Love") and "Promise Her Anything."

Mickey Hargitay, who plays King Banner in the film, was Mansfield's husband.

Nude scenes
Promises! Promises! became the first Hollywood feature release of the sound era to feature nudity by a mainstream star (Jayne Mansfield). That distinction would have belonged to Marilyn Monroe, who shot a nude scene for director George Cukor's Something's Got to Give in 1962, but the film went unfinished after Monroe's death. The first film featuring a mainstream star fully nude was A Daughter of the Gods (1916) featuring Annette Kellerman, but enforcement of the Motion Picture Production Code brought an end to nudity in mainstream American films.

Mansfield appears undressed in three scenes in Promises! Promises!. The scenes are repeated several times in the movie as dream sequences. In the first and longest (59 seconds) scene, Mansfield sings "I'm In Love" seminude in a foam-filled bathtub and then bends over with her back to the camera. She is also seen nude in brief glimpses as she dries herself with a towel and writhes on a bed. Mansfield reportedly drank champagne to relax before appearing nude in front of the camera.

Though the film actually shows Mansfield only topless, a photo in Kenneth Anger's book Hollywood Babylon shows her on the set completely nude, with pubic hair visible.

During the 1960s, some 8-mm film mail-order companies sold the nude footage. After Mansfield's death, the documentary The Wild, Wild World of Jayne Mansfield (1968) included nude scenes from the film and pages from the Playboy pictorial, along with scenes from her other films including Too Hot to Handle (1960), The Loves of Hercules (1960) and L'Amore Primitivo (1964).

Release 
The film was heavily publicized in the June 1963 issue of Playboy, featuring nude photos of Mansfield. The publication led to an obscenity charge against Hugh Hefner, who was arrested by Chicago police in June 1963, but the subsequent jury trial ended in acquittal. Copies of the issue reportedly sold for as much as $10 each.

Upon its theatrical release in 1963, Promises! Promises! was banned in Cleveland and several other cities, although a Cleveland court later ruled that the nude scenes were not obscene. Both the original and an edited version enjoyed box-office success in places where it was not banned, except for California.

The film was presented for the first time on television in its uncut form in 1984 on the Playboy Channel. The film was one of several dozen sound films to have been released in full-length form on Super 8mm in the 1970s. The film was released on VHS and Betamax videotape in the 1980s. On February 14, 2006, VCI Home Video released the film on DVD with extras such as original trailers and a gallery of stills from the Playboy issue, along with previously unreleased lobby cards.

Reception
Mansfield was voted one of the top 10 box-office attractions by theater owners in 1963.

Chicago Sun-Times movie critic Roger Ebert wrote: "Finally, in 'Promises, Promises' she did what no Hollywood actress ever does except in desperation: she made a nudie. By 1963, that kind of box office appeal was about all she had left."

See also
 List of American films of 1963
 Nudity in film
 Sex in film

References

External links

 
 
 

1963 films
1960s sex comedy films
Works subject to a lawsuit
American sex comedy films
1960s English-language films
Nudity in film
Obscenity controversies in film
Rating controversies in film
Sexual-related controversies in film
Film controversies in the United States
American sexploitation films
1963 comedy films
1960s American films